Hansi Jochmann (born 19 February 1953) is a German actress. She appeared in more than seventy films since 1960.

She is the German dubbing voice of Jodie Foster.

Selected filmography

References

External links 

1953 births
Living people
German film actresses
German voice actresses